The South Metro Express Lanes is a completed Georgia Department of Transportation (GDOT) project which has put Peach Pass-only reversible toll lanes along the medians of Interstate 75 (I-75) and I-675 in the southern suburbs of the Atlanta metropolitan area. It carries traffic between Henry and Clayton counties by adding two lanes for paying vehicles along I-75 from SR 20/SR 81 north to I-675 and one south of SR 20/SR 81 to the interstate's interchange with SR 155.

History
GDOT determined in a study conducted between 2007 and 2010 that the addition of more general purpose lanes to many locations in the Metro Atlanta area was not feasible. Instead the department opted to create managed lanes to "preserve mobility choices and provide financially feasible improvements". During the study, the corridor between the southern side of Interstate 285 and SR 16 was determined to be an intermediate priority for a system of managed lanes throughout the metro area. It was determined that it wouldn't require much to install reversible at-grade lanes, and ultimately, bi-direction lanes based on space limitations and pre-existing structures along the studied area. It was decided by the end of the study that a highest priority of the Managed Lane System was the corridor between SR 155 and SR 138, requiring at least one managed lane. Construction of the project was awarded to the contracting company C.W. Matthews and Arcadis US.

The groundbreaking for the project was held in October 2014. Crews worked alongside moving traffic with minimal nightly lane closures to minimize disturbance to traffic.

The project was completed on January 28, 2017 at a total cost of $226 million.

Future
The Managed Lanes System calls for the lanes to be extended from their current northern terminus at SR 138 to the HOV lanes at CW Grant Pkwy. The date of construction is undetermined.

Criticism
Prior to its opening local officials and businessmen criticized the project for various reasons, including fears that potential customers would be discouraged from using the hotels, restaurants and other services in the project area due to lack of access to local exits and apprehension towards the risk of accidents due to drivers being unfamiliar with the system, and that emergency vehicles will face difficulty responding to emergencies on the lanes.

Henry County Commissioner Bruce Holmes had mixed reviews of the project. The commissioner said the county needs managed lanes as well as a proposed $1.4 billion personal rapid transit system.

Junction list
The mile markings of the express lanes shares the same numbering as the mainline interstate. The exits are not numbered.

Interstate 75 Express Lanes

See also
 Northwest Corridor Express Lanes— a similar project along I-75 and I-575 in the Northern Metro Atlanta area

References

External links

Transportation in Clayton County, Georgia
Transportation in Henry County, Georgia
Interstate 75
Transportation in Atlanta
Roads with a reversible lane